Tanja Schmidt-Hennes (born 30 June 1971 in Attendorn) is a former German professional cyclist. She was part of the 2007 Team Flexpoint and the 2008 Team Specialized Designs for Women. She retired in 2009.

Notable results

2002
3rd overall in Damesronde van Drenthe
2004
3rd in Lowland International Rotterdam Tour
2005
 2nd in Ronde van Gelderland
 1st in 1st stage Eko Tour Dookola Polski
 2nd in German National Road Race Championship, Elite
 1st in 4th stage (B) Holland Ladies Tour
 1st overall in Holland Ladies Tour
2006  (Buitenpoort–Flexpoint Team)
 1st in 3rd stage Trophée d'Or Féminin
 3rd in Omloop Het Volk
 2nd in Ronde van Gelderland
 2nd in Sparkassen Giro
 2nd in Lowland International Rotterdam Tour

References
UCI.ch

External links

1971 births
Living people
People from Olpe (district)
Sportspeople from Arnsberg (region)
Cyclists from North Rhine-Westphalia
German female cyclists